The 1986 NCAA Women's Division I Swimming and Diving Championships were contested at the fifth annual NCAA-sanctioned swim meet to determine the team and individual national champions of Division I women's collegiate swimming and diving in the United States. 

This year's events were hosted at the Arkansas Natatorium at the University of Arkansas in Fayetteville, Arkansas

Two-time defending champions Texas again topped the team standings, finishing 47 points ahead of Florida, claiming the Longhorns' third women's team title.

Team standings
Note: Top 10 only
(H) = Hosts
(DC) = Defending champions
Full results

See also
List of college swimming and diving teams

References

NCAA Division I Swimming And Diving Championships
NCAA Division I Swimming And Diving Championships
NCAA Division I Women's Swimming and Diving Championships